Willow Run was a factory near Ypsilanti, Michigan in the United States that manufactured B-24 Liberator bombers during World War II.

Willow Run may also refer to:

 Willow Run Airport, a cargo and general aviation airport on the site of the former aircraft plant
 Willow Run, Michigan, an unincorporated community established at the airport
 Willow Run Assembly, a former General Motors plant on the site of the former aircraft plant
 Willow Run Transmission, a General Motors factory on the site of the former aircraft plant
 Willow Run Laboratories, founded in 1946 as the Michigan Aeronautical Research Center, which in 1972 became the Environmental Research Institute of Michigan, after separating from the University of Michigan
 Willow Run (Husbands Run tributary), a stream in New Castle County, Delaware